Folliott Herbert Walker Cornewall (bapt. 9 May 1754 – 5 September 1831) was an English bishop of three sees.

Life
Folliott (or Folliot) Herbert Cornewall was baptised in Ludlow on 9 May 1754, the second surviving son of Captain Frederick Cornewall  and Mary, daughter of Francis Herbert of Ludlow, first cousin of Henry Herbert, 1st Earl of Powis. He was educated at Eton College before going to St. John's College, Cambridge, where he matriculated in 1776, was awarded a B. A. and an M. A. in 1780. He was a Fellow from 1777 to 1784.

Cornewall was ordained as a deacon on 14 December 1777, and as a priest on 20 December 1778, by John Hinchliffe, Bishop of Peterborough. In 1780, through the interest of his second cousin, Charles Wolfran Cornwall, Speaker of the House of Commons, he obtained the post of Chaplain to the Speaker of the House of Commons. He became rector of Frilsham in 1781, and vicar of East Rudham in 1786. He was also preferred to a canonry at Windsor in 1784.

Cornewall inherited the estates of his older brother, Frederick, on his death in 1783, and also those of a relative: Francis Walker of Ferney Hall. To obtain the latter inheritance, Cornewall added the name "Walker" to his own. He was appointed master of Wigston's Hospital, Leicester, in 1790, dean of Canterbury in 1792, bishop of Bristol in 1797. He exchanged this see to become bishop of Hereford in 1803, and in 1808 he was translated to be bishop of Worcester.

In 1817 he served as treasurer of the Salop Infirmary in Shrewsbury.

He published A Sermon preached before the House of Commons on 30 Jan. 1782, and also A Fast Sermon preached before the House of Lords in 1798.

Marriage and family 

Cornewall married Anne (d. 15 December 1795), eldest daughter of George Hamilton, canon of Windsor, n 19 June 1787, at Taplow, Buckinghamshire. The couple had three children:

 Frederick Hamilton Cornewall (1791–1845)
 Marianne Cornewall (1793–1865)
 Herbert Cornewall (1794–1863)

Folliot Cornewall died at Hartlebury on 5 September 1831 aged 77, and was buried in the family vault at Diddlebury, Shropshire.

According to the Gentleman's Magazine, he "was possessed of fair scholarship, strong good sense, polished manners, and an amiable temper: and had passed a virtuous and exemplary life."

References

1754 births
1831 deaths
Bishops of Bristol
Bishops of Hereford
Bishops of Worcester
Deans of Canterbury
Clergy from Shropshire
People educated at Eton College
Alumni of St John's College, Cambridge
Canons of Windsor
English sermon writers
Chaplains of the House of Commons (UK)
19th-century Church of England bishops